Mark Howard Gorton (born November 7, 1966) is the creator of LimeWire, a peer-to-peer file sharing client for the Java Platform, and chief executive of the Lime Group. Lime Group, based in New York, owns LimeWire as well as Lime Brokerage LLC (a stock brokerage), Tower Research Capital LLC (a hedge fund), and LimeMedical LLC (a medical software company).

Gorton has been a key figure in Arista Records LLC v. Lime Group LLC.

Gorton is involved in various green lifestyle issues especially those having to do with transportation. At one point, Gorton was the single largest supporter of Transportation Alternatives, the New York City-based advocacy group for pedestrians, cyclists, and public transit. In 1999 he founded OpenPlans, a non-profit organization that developed GeoServer, a collaborative open source project encouraging green urban planning initiatives. In 2009 Utne Reader named Gorton one of "50 visionaries who are changing your world".

In 2005 Gorton backed The New York City Streets Renaissance Campaign (NYSCR). Two of the best known projects of NYSCR are Streetsblog and Streetfilms.

Gorton owns Tower Research Capital LLC, a financial services firm he started in 1998, which trades through its affiliate, Lime Brokerage LLC. Prior to that he spent 4½ years in the proprietary trading department of Credit Suisse First Boston (now Credit Suisse).

Gorton holds a Bachelor's in Electrical Engineering from Yale University, a Master's in Electrical Engineering from Stanford University, and an MBA from Harvard University. He began his career as an electrical engineer for Martin Marietta (now part of Lockheed Martin), and, following his interests in business, entered the world of fixed-income trading at Credit Suisse First Boston prior to going out on his own and launching the Lime Group of companies.

Notes

1966 births
Living people
Stanford University School of Engineering alumni
Harvard Business School alumni
Yale University alumni
Sustainable transport pioneers